Parliament Hill School is a secondary school for girls with a mixed sixth form located in the Borough of Camden in London, England. In 2013, there were 1,250 students on roll, between the ages of 11 and 18.

History

Grammar school
The school is the former Parliament Hill Grammar School.

Comprehensive
It became a comprehensive in 1957.

Location and facilities
The school is located on the edge of Hampstead Heath and comprises a combination of both modern and traditional buildings.

In January 2014, the school unveiled plans for a £19 million redevelopment of the school, encompassing the construction of two new buildings to replace a number of the older ones. The new buildings are designed to be environmentally friendly, incorporating a number of features to reduce carbon emissions. The new development will include a new sixth form centre for students at the LaSWAP Sixth Form.

Academic performance

Parliament Hill School was rated 'Good' overall by Ofsted inspectors in 2013, with behaviour and safety of students and leadership and management rated 'Outstanding'. The number of students achieving five or more A*–C grades including English and Maths in 2013 was 67%, 14 percentage points higher than the national average.

Students at the school come from a wide range of socioeconomic and ethnic backgrounds, and almost half of students speak English as an additional language. The majority of students move on to the LaSWAP Sixth Form following completion of their GCSE courses.

The school has Investors in People accreditation and participates in the London Excellence in Work Experience Scheme.

Sixth Form
The school is part of the successful LaSWAP Sixth Form consortium, along with the neighbouring schools La Sainte Union Catholic School, William Ellis School and Acland Burghley School. The Sixth Form focuses strongly on academic qualifications, and there were 1,266 students on roll in 2013. 79% of students achieved three or more A Level qualifications in 2013.

Notable former pupils

 Dua Lipa, singer
 Emma Hayes OBE, football manager
 Grace Campbell (comedian)
 Kirby Howell-Baptiste, actress
 Lily McMenamy, model and actress
 Rosie Pope, entrepreneur
 Laura Trevelyan, BBC journalist

Parliament Hill Grammar School
 Katrin Cartlidge, actress
 Mary Louise Coulouris, artist
 Shani Rhys James, artist
 Margot Shiner, gastroenterologist
 Lola Young, Baroness Young of Hornsey OBE, artist

References

Secondary schools in the London Borough of Camden
Educational institutions established in 1906
Girls' schools in London
1906 establishments in England
Community schools in the London Borough of Camden